Tamer Seckin, MD, FACOG, is a New York City-based gynecologist, laparoscopic surgeon, and specialist in endometriosis. He founded the Endometriosis Foundation of America (EFA) with Padma Lakshmi in 2009.

Early life and education
Seckin was born in Ankara, Turkey. He graduated from Tarsus American College in 1972 and received his medical degree from Hacettepe University School of Medicine in 1978. He completed his gynecological residency training in 1985 at the Children's Hospital of State University of New York at Buffalo.

Career
Seckin was the chief of gynecology at Kingsbrook Jewish Medical Center. He is an associate attending physician and clinical instructor at Lenox Hill Hospital and also has a private practice in New York City.

Seckin is a member of the American Medical Association, the American College of Obstetrics & Gynecology, the European Society of Reproductive Endocrinology, the Society of Laparoendoscopic Surgeons, the American Association of Gynecologic Laparoscopists, the American Fertility Society, the American Society for Reproductive Medicine, the Society of Reproductive Surgeons, the New York Gynecological Society, and the Society of Reproductive Endocrinology and Infertility. He was also the executive committee member of the International Society of Gynecological Endoscopy.

In 2012, Seckin received the United States Ellis Island Medal of Honor. He is a member of the Board of Directors of the American Turkish Society.

Endometriosis Foundation of America
In 2006, Seckin founded the Endometriosis Foundation of America with patients including Padma Lakshmi. EFA was established to correct misdiagnoses and raise public awareness through programs in New York City high schools that educate school nurses, students, and teachers about endometriosis. Starting in 2009, Seckin organized yearly conferences on advancing the science and surgery of endometriosis. Through the EFA, Seckin co-founded the ROSE (Research Outsmarts Endometriosis) Project at the New York-based Feinstein Institute for Medical Research. He says it is the first research project in the United States to investigate endometriosis tissue at its genetic signature.

Selected bibliography
Books
 
Journal publications

References

External links
 Official website
 Endometriosis Foundation of America
 Scientific publications

Living people
Physicians from New York City
Turkish emigrants to the United States
American gynecologists
Year of birth missing (living people)